Mechanicstown is an unincorporated community in northwestern Fox Township, Carroll County, Ohio, United States.  It has a post office with the ZIP code 44651.  It lies at the intersection of State Routes 39 and 524. The community is part of the Canton–Massillon Metropolitan Statistical Area.

History
The community was laid out in 1836 by Thomas McGavern.  On March 21, 1837, the Ohio General Assembly approved a name change from "Mechanicsburgh" to "Mechanicstown."

Willis Elementary, of the Carrollton Exempted Village School District and located outside of town, was closed in 2008.

Education
Students attend schools in the Carrollton Exempted Village School District.

Notable people
Thomas B. Fletcher — five-term U.S. Representative
Wilbur S. Jackman - educator

References

Unincorporated communities in Carroll County, Ohio
1836 establishments in Ohio
Populated places established in 1836
Unincorporated communities in Ohio